Aleksandr Yuryevich Dozmorov (born 3 March 1962) is a Russian professional football coach and a former player.

Club career
He played 7 seasons in the Soviet Top League for FC Torpedo Moscow, FC Dinamo Minsk and FC Lokomotiv Moscow.

He played 1 game in the UEFA Cup 1986–87 for FC Dinamo Minsk.

Honours 
 Soviet Cup finalist: 1982, 1987, 1991.

External links 
 

Russian footballers
Russian expatriate footballers
Soviet footballers
Soviet expatriate footballers
Russian football managers
Russian expatriate sportspeople in Hungary
Expatriate footballers in Hungary
Russian expatriate sportspeople in Moldova
Expatriate footballers in Moldova
Russian expatriate sportspeople in Bangladesh
Expatriate footballers in Bangladesh
Russian expatriate sportspeople in Belarus
FC Torpedo Moscow players
FC Dinamo Minsk players
FC Lokomotiv Moscow players
FC Guria Lanchkhuti players
Vasas SC players
FC Asmaral Moscow players
FC Rubin Kazan players
FC Shinnik Yaroslavl players
FC Moscow players
FC Energiya Volzhsky players
Soviet Top League players
1962 births
Footballers from Moscow
Living people
Association football midfielders
FC FShM Torpedo Moscow players